Machin is a township in the Canadian province of Ontario, located in the Kenora District west of Dryden.

The main communities in Machin township are Eagle River, Minnitaki, and Vermilion Bay. The junction of Highway 17 and Highway 105 is located in Machin, just east of Vermilion Bay.

Demographics 

Historic populations:
 Population in 2016: 971
 Population in 2011: 935
 Population in 2006: 978
 Population in 2001: 1,143
 Population in 1996: 1,117
 Population in 1991: 1,127

See also
List of townships in Ontario

References

External links

Municipalities in Kenora District
Single-tier municipalities in Ontario
Township municipalities in Ontario